Marcos Giron was the defending champion but chose not to defend his title.

Brandon Nakashima won the title after defeating Prajnesh Gunneswaran 6–3, 6–4 in the final.

Seeds

Draw

Finals

Top half

Bottom half

References

External links
Main draw
Qualifying draw

Orlando Open - Singles